This glossary of economics is a list of definitions of terms and concepts used in economics, its sub-disciplines, and related fields.

0–9

A

B

C

D

E

F

G

H

I

J

K

L

M

N

O

P

Q

R

S

T

U

V

W

Y

Z

See also
Outline of economics
Index of economics articles

References

Economics
Economics lists
Risk
Economics
Wikipedia glossaries using description lists